

Otto Schultz (31 May 1920 – 28 July 2013) was a German Luftwaffe ace and recipient of the Knight's Cross of the Iron Cross during World War II.

As part of JG 51 operating near Tunis, Schultz scored his first western victory on 1 December, downing a Spitfire. In December, the Gruppe was very successful over the new American pilots - claiming 50 victories while losing only two of their own. But as in Russia, in 1943, the superior numbers soon made their impact. In August, orders transferred II./JG 51 to Munich to retrain as a specialist anti-bomber unit.

With Romania's surrender to Soviet forces in late August, and its subsequent declaration of war against Germany, II./JG 51 retreated to Yugoslavia. Left as final air-cover for the army retreating out of Greece, 6./JG 51 reportedly engaged their former allies in Romanian-flown Bf 109s. Schultz was reportedly credited with 73 aerial victories in about 820 combat missions.

Awards

 Ehrenpokal der Luftwaffe (3 November 1941)

 German Cross in Gold on 24 September 1942 as Oberfeldwebel in the II./Jagdgeschwader 51
 Knight's Cross of the Iron Cross on 14 March 1943 as Oberfeldwebel and pilot in the 4./Jagdgeschwader 51

References

Citations

Bibliography

 Bergström, Christer; Dikov, Andrey; Antipov, Vlad (2006). 	Black Cross, Red Star Vol 3 	Eagle Editions Ltd 	
 
 
 
 
 
 Spick, Mike (2006). 	Aces of the Reich. 		Greenhill Books. 	
 
 

1920 births
2013 deaths
People from Dannenberg (Elbe)
People from the Province of Hanover
Luftwaffe pilots
German World War II flying aces
Recipients of the Gold German Cross
Recipients of the Knight's Cross of the Iron Cross
German Air Force personnel
Military personnel from Lower Saxony